

Notes

Post-nominal letters
Post-nominal letters
Jamaica